Edwin "Teddy" King (7 July 1884 – 1952) was a footballer who played for Leicester City in the Football League, either side of World War I. He played as a wing half, and joined Leicester Fosse (as City were then called) after playing for a number of local sides.

He made a total of 236 senior appearances for Leicester, plus another 121 wartime appearances.

He also played first-class cricket for Leicestershire in two matches in the 1925 season, playing as a wicketkeeper.

References 

Association football wing halves
English Football League players
Leicester City F.C. players
1884 births
1952 deaths
English footballers